Doug Walker (born January 11, 1952) is an American former politician who served for two terms as a Democrat in the Kansas State Senate, from 1989 to 1996.

Walker was born in Independence, Kansas. He worked as a high school teacher in the Osawatomie school system and served on the city council in Osawatomie from 1982 to 1986. He successfully won election to the Kansas Senate in 1988. During his time in the Senate, he served as Democratic Whip, and was the ranking minority member on the Education Committee and Public Health and Welfare Committee. He was succeeded in the Senate by Robert Tyson. After leaving the Senate, he continued working as a teacher through the 2000s, and also renovated the William Mills House, a property listed on the U.S. Register of Historic Places.

In 2016, Walker attempted a return to politics, announcing a run for the Kansas House of Representatives against Republican Kevin Jones. Walker was defeated, taking 41% of the vote to Jones' 59%.

References

Democratic Party Kansas state senators
Kansas Democrats
20th-century American politicians
21st-century American politicians
People from Osawatomie, Kansas
20th-century American educators
21st-century American educators
1952 births
Living people